Federal Route 502 (formerly Federal Route A7) is a 70-km federal highway in Sabah, Malaysia, connecting Beaufort to Menumbok before proceeding to Labuan via ferry services. It is commissioned as a tributary of the larger Pan Borneo Highway network, as it is the main highway from the main link (Federal Route 1) to Labuan.

List of interchanges 

Highways in Malaysia
Roads in Sabah